Boerlagea is a genus of flowering plants belonging to the family Melastomataceae.

Its native range is Borneo.

Species:

Boerlagea grandifolia

References

Melastomataceae
Melastomataceae genera
Taxa named by Alfred Cogniaux